BSNL Mobile (formerly CellOne) is a division of Bharat Sanchar Nigam Limited which is under the ownership of Department of Telecommunications under Ministry of Communications of the Government of India. It provides both pre-paid and post-paid mobile services as well as many value added services. BSNL Mobile has a pan-India presence with presence in all the 22 telecom circles in India. It is the fourth largest mobile network operator in India. It provides all of India services with roaming access, including Delhi, Kolkata and Mumbai, and International roaming access to more than 300 networks across the world.

As of 30 September 2022, BSNL Mobile has a subscriber base of 112.12 million,making it 4th largest mobile telecommunications network in India and 22nd largest mobile telecommunications network in the world.

History
The company's CellOne network (GSM/GPRS) was launched in late 2002 and has coverage in major cities and towns and more places are being covered. BSNL Mobile offers both GSM as well as CDMA prepaid and postpaid services. CellOne was renamed BSNL Mobile in 2007. It was the first company which made incoming roaming charges free across the country.

Operations

3G
On 27 February 2010, BSNL Mobile launched 3G services on Pan India. BSNL Mobile also has 3G Roaming services in Mumbai & Delhi for other circles subscribers through an agreement with MTNL, This gives BSNL Mobile a 3G presence in all 22 out of 22 circles in India.

4G
BSNL Mobile has started providing 4G services in some telecom circles of India. It has deployed LTE Band 1 in those telecom circles, by upgrading its existing 3G towers. As a part of a revamp package promised by the Indian Government, BSNL floated a tender in April 2020 for procuring tower related telecom equipment for LTE deployment in other bands. The ailing network provider hit another roadblock in deploying 4G towers. The Telecom Equipment Promotion Council (India) alleged that BSNL has floated the tender with stringent norms which would discourage the local vendors in the country. Meanwhile, there were no similar guidelines or directions given by any government agencies to any private players, arising a foul play suspicion. As of now, BSNL is expected to roll out 4G services using 60% of its existing towers which are capable of supporting LTE. Currently top management of BSNL are in talks with private network operators like Airtel India, Vodafone Idea for 4G ICRA to commence LTE services once the 4G procurement tender is passed successfully. After that its own 4G network will be available.

VoLTE
BSNL has launched VoLTE services in circles where it is providing its 4G services.

5G
BSNL Mobile is going to provide its 5G services from 15th August 2023.

VoNR

Spectrum frequency holding summary
BSNL owns spectrum in 600 MHz, 850 MHz, 900 MHz, 1800 MHz, 2100 MHz and 2500 MHz, 3500 MHz and 26 GHz bands across the country.

References

Telecommunications companies of India